When The Moors Ruled In Europe is a documentary film presented by the English historian Bettany Hughes. It is a two-part series on the contribution the Moors made to Europe during their 700-year reign in Spain and Portugal ending in the 15th century. It was first broadcast on Channel 4 Saturday 5 November 2005, and was filmed in the Spanish region of Andalusia, mostly in the cities of Granada, Cordoba and the Moroccan city of Fes.

The era ended with the Reconquista during which the Catholic authorities burnt over 1,000,000 Arabic texts.

See also
 List of Islamic films

References

External links 
 

Documentary films about historical events
Documentary films about Islam
2005 films
British documentary films
2005 documentary films
2000s English-language films
2000s British films
English-language documentary films